Frederick II (German: Friedrich; Italian: Federico; Latin: Fridericus; 26 December 1194 – 13 December 1250) was King of Sicily from 1198, King of Germany from 1212, King of Italy and Holy Roman Emperor from 1220 and King of Jerusalem from 1225. He was the son of emperor Henry VI of the Hohenstaufen dynasty and Queen Constance of Sicily of the Hauteville dynasty.

His political and cultural ambitions were enormous as he ruled a vast area, beginning with Sicily and stretching through Italy all the way north to Germany. As the Crusades progressed, he acquired control of Jerusalem and styled himself its king. However, the Papacy became his enemy, and it eventually prevailed. Viewing himself as a direct successor to the Roman emperors of antiquity, he was Emperor of the Romans from his papal coronation in 1220 until his death; he was also a claimant to the title of King of the Romans from 1212 and unopposed holder of that monarchy from 1215. As such, he was King of Germany, of Italy, and of Burgundy. At the age of three, he was crowned King of Sicily as a co-ruler with his mother, Constance of Hauteville, the daughter of Roger II of Sicily. His other royal title was King of Jerusalem by virtue of marriage and his connection with the Sixth Crusade. Frequently at war with the papacy, which was hemmed in between Frederick's lands in northern Italy and his Kingdom of Sicily (the Regno) to the south, he was excommunicated three times and often vilified in pro-papal chronicles of the time and after. Pope Gregory IX went so far as to call him an Antichrist.

Speaking six languages (Latin, Sicilian, Middle High German, French, Greek, and Arabic), Frederick has a reputation as a Renaissance man avant la lettre, as scientist, scholar, architect, poet and composer. As an avid patron of science and the arts, he played a major role in promoting literature through the Sicilian School of poetry. His Sicilian royal court in Palermo, beginning around 1220, saw the first use of a literary form of an Italo-Romance language, Sicilian. The poetry that emanated from the school had a significant influence on literature and on what was to become the modern Italian language. He was also the first king to formally outlaw trial by ordeal, which had come to be viewed as superstitious.

After his death his line did not survive, and the House of Hohenstaufen came to an end. Furthermore, the Holy Roman Empire entered a long period of decline during the Great Interregnum.

Historian Donald Detwiler wrote:  His complex political and cultural legacy has attracted fierce debates until this day.

Birth and naming

Born in Jesi, near Ancona, Italy, on 26 December 1194, Frederick was the son of the Holy Roman Emperor Henry VI. He was known as the puer Apuliae (son of Apulia). His mother Constance gave birth to him at the age of 40, and Boccaccio related in his De mulieribus claris about the empress: as a Sicilian princess and paternal aunt of William II of Sicily, a prediction that "her marriage would destroy Sicily" led to her confinement in a convent as a nun from childhood to remain celibate and her late engagement to Henry at the age of 30. Constance gave birth to him in a public square in order to forestall any doubt about his origin and the women who helped could witness the event. Frederick was baptised in Assisi in the church of San Rufino.

At birth Frederick was named Constantine by his mother. This name, a masculine form of his mother's name, served to identify him closely with both his Norman heritage and his imperial heritage (through Constantine the Great, the first Christian emperor). It was still his name at the time of his election as King of the Romans. He was only given his grandfathers' names, becoming Frederick Roger (or Roger Frederick), at his baptism when he was two years old. This dual name served the same purpose as Constantine: emphasising his dual heritage.

Frederick's birth was accompanied by gossip and rumour on account of his mother's advanced age. According to Albert of Stade and Salimbene, he was not the son of Henry and Constance but was presented to Henry as his own after a faked pregnancy. His real father was variously described as a butcher of Jesi, a physician, a miller or a falconer. Frederick's birth was also associated with a prophecy of Merlin. According to Andrea Dandolo, writing at some distance but probably recording contemporary gossip, Henry doubted reports of his wife's pregnancy and was only convinced by consulting Joachim of Fiore, who confirmed that Frederick was his son by interpretation of Merlin's prophecy and the Erythraean Sibyl. A later legend claims that Constance gave birth in the public square of Jesi to silence doubters. None of these stories have any validity, although it is clear that Constance took unusual measures to prove her pregnancy and its legitimacy. Roger of Howden reports that she swore on the gospels before a papal legate that Frederick was her son and Henry's. It is probable that these public acts of affirmation on account of her age gave rise to some false rumours.

After Henry VI was crowned king of In the spring of 1195, not long after the birth of her son, Constance the empress continued her journey to Palermo. After the unexpected death of Tancred of Lecce (a bastard-son of Roger, eldest son of Roger II of Sicily) Henry had hurried over to assume power and to have himself crowned king. Frederick was entrusted to the care of the duchess of Spoleto, the wife of the Swabian noble Conrad I of Urslingen, who was named duke of Spoleto by Frederick Barbarossa. Frederick II stayed in Foligno, a place located in papal territory and so under papal jurisdiction, until the death of his father, on September 28 in 1197.

Minority

In 1196 at Frankfurt am Main the infant Frederick was elected King of the Romans and thus heir to his father's imperial crown. His rights in Germany were to end up disputed by Henry's brother Philip of Swabia and Otto of Brunswick. At the death of his father Henry VI in 1197, Frederick was in Italy, traveling towards Germany, when the bad news reached his guardian, Conrad of Spoleto. Frederick was hastily brought back to his mother Constance in Palermo, Sicily, where he was crowned King of Sicily on 17 May 1198, at just three years of age. Originally his title had been Romanorum et Sicilie rex (King of the Romans and Sicily), but in 1198, after Constance (who kept using title of Empress) found out that Philip of Swabia had been recognized by the Staufer supporters in Germany, she had her son renounce the title King of the Romans. She probably agreed with Philip that Frederick's perspective in Germany was hopeless. The decision strengthened Frederick's position in Sicily as this satisfied both Philip of Swabia and the Pope, who did not like the idea of a ruler who had authority in both Sicily and the North Alpine realm.

Constance of Sicily was in her own right queen of Sicily, and she established herself as regent. Constance sided with the Pope who preferred that Sicily and the Germans were under separate governments. She renounced the authority over the Sicilian state church to the papal side, but only as Sicilian queen and not as empress, seemingly with the intention of keeping options open for Frederick. Upon Constance's death in 1198, Pope Innocent III succeeded as Frederick's guardian. Frederick's tutor during this period was Cencio, who would become Pope Honorius III. Markward of Annweiler, with the support of Henry's brother, Philip of Swabia, reclaimed the regency for himself and soon after invaded the Kingdom of Sicily. In 1200, with the help of Genoese ships, he landed in Sicily and one year later seized the young Frederick. He thus ruled Sicily until 1202, when he was succeeded by another German captain, William of Capparone, who kept Frederick under his control in the royal palace of Palermo until 1206. Frederick was subsequently under tutor Walter of Palearia, until, in 1208, he was declared of age. At that time he spoke five languages, Greek, Arabic, Latin, Provençal and a Sicilian dialect. His first task was to reassert his power over Sicily and southern Italy, where local barons and adventurers had usurped most of the authority. Pope Innocent was in search a diplomatic match for his protege Frederick, to enable him successful future alliances. Eventually Constance of Aragon, a widower of the late King of Hungary and double his age was found.

Reign prior to the conflict with the pope

Otto of Brunswick had been crowned Holy Roman Emperor by Pope Innocent III in October 1209. In southern Italy, Otto became the champion of those noblemen and barons who feared Frederick's increasingly strong measures to check their power, such as the dismissal of the pro-noble Walter of Palearia. The new emperor invaded Italy, where he reached Calabria without meeting much resistance.

In response, Innocent sided against Otto, and in September 1211 at the Diet of Nuremberg Frederick was elected in absentia as German King by a rebellious faction backed by the pope. Innocent also excommunicated Otto, who was forced to return to Germany. Frederick sailed to Gaeta with a small following. He agreed with the pope on a future separation between the Sicilian and Imperial titles, and named his wife Constance as regent. Passing through Lombardy and Engadin, he reached Konstanz in September 1212, preceding Otto by a few hours.

Frederick was crowned as king on 9 December 1212 in Mainz. Frederick's authority in Germany remained tenuous, and he was recognized only in southern Germany. In the region of northern Germany, the center of Guelph power, Otto continued to hold the reins of royal and imperial power despite his excommunication. Otto's decisive military defeat at the Bouvines forced him to withdraw to the Guelph hereditary lands where, virtually without supporters, he died in 1218.

The German princes, supported by Innocent III, again elected Frederick king of Germany in 1215, and he was crowned king in Aachen on 23 July 1215 by one of the three German archbishops. It was not until another five years had passed, and only after further negotiations between Frederick, Innocent III, and Honorius III – who succeeded to the papacy after Innocent's death in 1216 – that Frederick was crowned Holy Roman Emperor in Rome by Honorius III, on 22 November 1220. At the same time, Frederick's oldest son Henry took the title of King of the Romans.

Unlike most Holy Roman emperors, Frederick spent few years in Germany. In 1218, he helped King Philip II of France and Odo III, Duke of Burgundy, to bring an end to the War of Succession in Champagne (France) by invading Lorraine, capturing and burning Nancy, capturing Theobald I, Duke of Lorraine and forcing him to withdraw his support from Erard of Brienne-Ramerupt. After his coronation in 1220, Frederick remained either in the Kingdom of Sicily or on Crusade until 1236, when he made his last journey to Germany. He returned to Italy in 1237 and stayed there for the remaining thirteen years of his life, represented in Germany by his son Conrad.

In the Kingdom of Sicily, he built on the reform of the laws begun at the Assizes of Ariano in 1140 by his grandfather Roger II. His initiative in this direction was visible as early as the Assizes of Capua (1220, issued soon after his coronation in Rome) but came to fruition in his promulgation of the Constitutions of Melfi (1231, also known as Liber Augustalis), a collection of laws for his realm that was remarkable for its time and was a source of inspiration for a long time after. It made the Kingdom of Sicily an absolutist monarchy; it also set a precedent for the primacy of written law. With relatively small modifications, the Liber Augustalis remained the basis of Sicilian law until 1819.

In 1223–1224, Frederick tried Bishop Aldoin of Cefalù for maladministration. The trial was nullified by the pope on procedural grounds.

Foreign policy and wars

The Fifth Crusade and early policies in northern Italy

At the time he was elected King of the Romans, Frederick promised to go on crusade. He continually delayed, however, and, in spite of his renewal of this vow at his coronation as the King of Germany, he did not travel to Egypt with the armies of the Fifth Crusade in 1217. He sent forces to Egypt under the command of Louis I, Duke of Bavaria, but constant expectation of his arrival caused papal legate Pelagius to reject Ayyubid sultan Al-Kamil's offer to restore the Latin Kingdom of Jerusalem to the crusaders in exchange for their withdrawal from Egypt and caused the Crusade to continually stall in anticipation of his ever-delayed arrival. The crusade ended in failure with the loss of Damietta in 1221. Frederick was blamed by both Pope Honorius III and the general Christian populace for this calamitous defeat.

In 1225, after agreeing with Pope Honorius to launch a Crusade before 1228, Frederick summoned an imperial Diet at Cremona, the main pro-imperial city in Lombardy: the main arguments for holding the Diet would be to continue the struggle against heresy, to organize the crusade and, above all, to restore the imperial power in northern Italy, which had long been usurped by the numerous communes located there. Those assembled responded with the reformation of the Lombard League, which had already defeated his grandfather Frederick Barbarossa in the 12th century, and again Milan was chosen as the league's leader. The Diet was cancelled, however, and the situation was stabilized only through a compromise reached by Honorius between Frederick and the league. During his sojourn in northern Italy, Frederick also invested the Teutonic Order with the territories in what would become East Prussia, starting what was later called the Northern Crusade.

Frederick was distracted with the League when in June 1226 Louis VIII of France laid siege to Avignon, an imperial city. The barons of the French army sent a letter to Frederick defending their action as a military necessity, and a few days after the start of the siege Henry (VII) ratified an alliance with France that had been signed in 1223.

The Sixth Crusade

Problems of stability within the empire delayed Frederick's departure on crusade. It was not until 1225, when, by proxy, Frederick had married Isabella II of Jerusalem, heiress to the Kingdom of Jerusalem, that his departure seemed assured. Frederick immediately saw to it that his new father-in-law John of Brienne, the current king of Jerusalem, was dispossessed and his rights transferred to the emperor. In August 1227, Frederick set out for the Holy Land from Brindisi but was forced to return when he was struck down by an epidemic that had broken out. Even the master of the Teutonic Knights, Hermann of Salza, recommended that he return to the mainland to recuperate. On 29 September 1227, Frederick was excommunicated by Pope Gregory IX for failing to honor his crusading pledge.

Many contemporary chroniclers doubted the sincerity of Frederick's illness, and their attitude may be explained by their pro-papal leanings. Roger of Wendover, a chronicler of the time, wrote:

Frederick eventually sailed again from Brindisi in June 1228. The pope, still Gregory IX, regarded that action as a provocation, since, as an excommunicate, Frederick was technically not capable of conducting a crusade, and he excommunicated the emperor a second time. Frederick reached Acre in September. Many of the local nobility, the Templars, and Hospitallers were therefore reluctant to offer overt support. Since the crusading army was already a small force, Frederick negotiated along the lines of a previous agreement he had intended to broker with the Ayyubid sultan, Al-Kamil. The treaty, signed in February 1229, resulted in the restitution of Jerusalem, Nazareth, Bethlehem, and a small coastal strip to the Kingdom of Jerusalem, though there are disagreements as to the extent of the territory returned.

The treaty also stipulated that the Dome of the Rock and al-Aqsa Mosque were to remain under Muslim control and that the city of Jerusalem would remain without fortifications. Virtually all other crusaders, including the Templars and Hospitallers, condemned this deal as a political ploy on the part of Frederick to regain his kingdom while betraying the cause of the Crusaders. Al-Kamil, who was nervous about possible war with his relatives who ruled Syria and Mesopotamia, wished to avoid further trouble from the Christians, at least until his domestic rivals were subdued.

The crusade ended in a truce and in Frederick's coronation as King of Jerusalem on 18 March 1229, although this was technically improper. Frederick's wife Isabella, the heiress, had died, leaving their infant son Conrad as rightful king. There is also disagreement as to whether the "coronation" was a coronation at all, as a letter written by Frederick to Henry III of England suggests that the crown he placed on his own head was in fact the imperial crown of the Romans.

At his coronation, he may have worn the red silk mantle that had been crafted during the reign of Roger II. It bore an Arabic inscription indicating that the robe dated from the year 528 in the Muslim calendar, and incorporated a generic benediction, wishing its wearer "vast prosperity, great generosity and high splendor, fame and magnificent endowments, and the fulfillment of his wishes and hopes. May his days and nights go in pleasure without end or change." This coronation robe can be found today in the Schatzkammer of the Kunsthistorisches Museum in Vienna.

In any case, Gerald of Lausanne, the Latin Patriarch of Jerusalem, did not attend the ceremony; indeed, the next day the Bishop of Caesarea arrived to place the city under interdict on the patriarch's orders. Frederick's further attempts to rule over the Kingdom of Jerusalem were met by resistance on the part of the barons, led by John of Ibelin, Lord of Beirut. In the mid-1230s, Frederick's viceroy was forced to leave Acre, and in 1244, following a siege, Jerusalem itself was lost again to a new Muslim offensive.

Whilst Frederick's seeming bloodless recovery of Jerusalem for the cross brought him great prestige in some European circles, his decision to complete the crusade while excommunicated provoked Church hostility. Although in 1230 the Pope lifted Frederick's excommunication, this decision was taken for a variety of reasons related to the political situation in Europe. Of Frederick's crusade, Philip of Novara, a chronicler of the period, said, "The emperor left Acre [after the conclusion of the truce]; hated, cursed, and vilified." Overall this crusade, arguably the first successful one since the First Crusade, was adversely affected by the manner in which Frederick carried out negotiations without the support of the church. He left behind a kingdom in the Levant torn between his agents and the local nobility, a civil war known as the War of the Lombards.

The itinerant Joachimite preachers and many radical Franciscans, the Spirituals, supported Frederick. Against the interdict pronounced on his lands, the preachers condemned the Pope and continued to minister the sacraments and grant absolutions. Brother Arnold in Swabia proclaimed the Second Coming for 1260, at which time Frederick would then confiscate the riches of Rome and distribute them among the poor, the "only true Christians".

War of the Keys

During Frederick's stay in the Holy Land, his regent, Rainald of Spoleto, had attacked the March of Ancona and the Duchy of Spoleto. Gregory IX recruited an army under John of Brienne and, in 1229, invaded southern Italy. His troops overcame an initial resistance at Montecassino and reached Apulia. Frederick arrived at Brindisi in June 1229. He quickly recovered the lost territories, and tried and condemned the rebel barons, but avoided crossing the borders of the Papal States.

The war came to an end with the Treaty of San Germano in July 1230. On 28 August, in a public ceremony in Ceprano, the papal legates Thomas of Capua and Giovanni Colonna absolved Frederick and lifted his excommunication. The emperor personally met Gregory IX at Anagni, making some concessions to the church in Sicily. He also issued the Constitutions of Melfi (August 1231), as an attempt to solve the political and administrative problems of the country, which had dramatically been shown by the recent war.

Henry's revolt
While he may have temporarily made his peace with the pope, Frederick found the German princes another matter. Frederick's son Henry VII (who was born 1211 in Sicily, son of Frederick's first wife Constance of Aragon) had caused their discontent with an aggressive policy against their privileges. This forced Henry to a complete capitulation, and the Statutum in favorem principum ("Statutes in favor of the princes"), issued at Worms, deprived the emperor of much of his sovereignty in Germany. Frederick summoned Henry to a meeting, which was held at Aquileia in 1232. Henry confirmed his submission, but Frederick was nevertheless compelled to confirm the Statutum at Cividale soon afterwards.

The situation for Frederick was also problematic in Lombardy, after all the emperor's attempts to restore the imperial authority in Lombardy with the help of Gregory IX (at the time, ousted from Rome by a revolt) turned to nothing in 1233. In the meantime Henry in Germany had returned to an anti-princes policy, against his father's will: Frederick thus obtained his excommunication from Gregory IX (July 1234). Henry tried to muster an opposition in Germany and asked the Lombard cities to block the Alpine passes. In May 1235, Frederick went to Germany, taking no army with him: as soon as July, however, he was able to force his son to renounce to the crown all his lands, at Worms, and then imprisoned him.

In Germany the Hohenstaufen and the Guelphs reconciled in 1235. Otto the Child, the grandson of Henry the Lion, had been deposed as Duke of Bavaria and Saxony in 1180, conveying the allodial Guelphic possessions to Frederick, who in return enfeoffed Otto with the same lands and additional former imperial possessions as the newly established Duke of Brunswick-Lüneburg, ending the unclear status of the German Guelphs, who had been left without title and rank after 1180.

The war for Lombardy and Italy

With peace north of the Alps, Frederick raised an army from the German princes to suppress the rebel cities in Lombardy. Gregory tried to stop the invasion with diplomatic moves, but in vain. During his descent to Italy, Frederick had to divert his troops to quell a rebellion of Frederick II, Duke of Austria. At Vienna, in February 1237, he obtained the title of King of the Romans for his 9-year-old son Conrad.

After the failure of the negotiations between the Lombard cities, the pope and the imperial diplomats, Frederick invaded Lombardy from Verona. In November 1237 he won the decisive battle in Cortenuova over the Lombard League. Frederick celebrated it with a triumph in Cremona in the manner of an ancient Roman emperor, with the captured carroccio (later sent to the commune of Rome) and an elephant. He rejected any suit for peace, even from Milan, which had sent a great sum of money. This demand of total surrender spurred further resistance from Milan, Brescia, Bologna, and Piacenza, and in October 1238 he was forced to raise the siege of Brescia, in the course of which his enemies had tried unsuccessfully to capture him.

Frederick received the news of his excommunication by Gregory IX in the first months of 1239 while his court was in Padua The emperor responded by expelling the Franciscans and the Dominicans from Lombardy and electing his son Enzo as Imperial vicar for Northern Italy. Enzo soon annexed the Romagna, Marche, and the Duchy of Spoleto, nominally part of the Papal States. The father announced he was to destroy the Republic of Venice, which had sent some ships against Sicily. In December of that year Frederick entered Tuscany and spent Christmas in Pisa. In January 1240, Frederick triumphantly entered Foligno followed by Viterbo, whence he aimed to finally conquer Rome to restore the ancient splendours of the Empire. Frederick's plan to attack Rome at that time, however, did not come to fruition as he chose to leave for southern Italy where a papal incited rebellion flared in Apulia. In southern Italy, Frederick attacked and razed St Angelo and Benevento.

In the meantime the Ghibelline city of Ferrara had fallen, and Frederick swept his way northwards capturing Ravenna and, after another long siege, Faenza. The people of Forlì, which had kept its Ghibelline stance even after the collapse of Hohenstaufen power, offered their loyal support during the capture of the rival city: as a sign of gratitude, they were granted an augmentation of the communal coat-of-arms with the Hohenstaufen eagle, together with other privileges. This episode shows how the independent cities used the rivalry between Empire and Pope as a means to obtain maximum advantage for themselves.

At this time, Gregory considered yielding. A truce occurred and peace negotiations began. Direct peace negotiations ultimately failed and Gregory called for a General Council. Frederick and his allies, however, dashed Gregory's plan for a General Council when they intercepted a delegation of prelates traveling to Rome in a Genoese fleet at the Battle of Giglio (1241).

Frederick then directed his army toward Rome and the Pope, burning and destroying Umbria as he advanced. Then just as the Emperor's forces were ready to attack Rome, Gregory died on 22 August 1241. Frederick then attempted to show that the war was not directed against the Church of Rome but against the Pope by withdrawing his troops and freeing from prison in Capua two cardinals he had captured at Giglio, Otto of Tonengo and James of Pecorara. Frederick then traveled to Sicily to wait for the election of a new pope.

Mongol raids

In 1241–1242, the forces of the Mongol Empire decisively defeated the armies of Hungary and Poland and devastated their countryside and all their unfortified settlements. King Béla IV of Hungary appealed to Frederick for aid, but Frederick, being in dispute with the Hungarian king for some time (as Bela had sided with the Papacy against him) and not wanting to commit to a major military expedition so readily, refused. He was unwilling to cross into Hungary, and although he went about unifying his magnates and other monarchs to potentially face a Mongol invasion, he specifically took his vow for the defense of the empire on "this side of the Alps".

Frederick was aware of the danger the Mongols posed, and grimly assessed the situation, but also tried to use it as leverage over the Papacy to frame himself as the protector of Christendom. While he called them traitorous pagans, Frederick expressed an admiration for Mongol military prowess after hearing of their deeds, in particular their able commanders and fierce discipline and obedience, judging the latter to be the greatest source of their success. He called a levy throughout Germany while the Mongols were busy raiding Hungary. In mid-1241, Federick dispersed his army back to their holdfasts as the Mongols preoccupied themselves with the lands east of the Danube, attempting to smash all Hungarian resistance. He subsequently ordered his vassals to strengthen their defenses, adopt a defensive posture, and gather large numbers of crossbowmen.

A chronicler reports that Frederick received a demand of submission from Batu Khan at some time, which he ignored. He apparently kept up to date on the Mongols' activities, as a letter from Frederick II dated June 1241 comments that the Mongols were now using looted Hungarian armor. A letter written by Emperor Frederick II, found in the Regesta Imperii, dated to 20 June 1241, and intended for all his vassals in Swabia, Austria, and Bohemia, included a number of specific military instructions. His forces were to avoid engaging the Mongols in field battles, hoard all food stocks in every fortress and stronghold, and arm all possible levies as well as the general populace.

Thomas of Split comments that there was a frenzy of fortifying castles and cities throughout the Holy Roman Empire, including Italy. Either following the Emperor's instructions or on their own initiative, Frederick II, Duke of Austria paid to have his border castles strengthened at his own expense. King Wenceslaus I of Bohemia had every castle strengthened and provisioned, as well as providing soldiers and armaments to monasteries in order to turn them into refuges for the civilian population.

Mongol probing attacks materialised on the Holy Roman Empire's border states: a force was repulsed in a skirmish near Kłodzko, 300–700 Mongol troops were killed in a battle near Vienna to 100 Austrian losses (according to the Duke of Austria), and a Mongol raiding party was destroyed by Austrian knights in the district of Theben after being backed to the border of the River March. As the Holy Roman Empire seemed now the target of the Mongols, Frederick II sent letters to Henry III of England and Louis IX of France in order to organise a crusade against the Mongol Empire.
A full-scale invasion never occurred, as the Mongols spent the next year pillaging Hungary before withdrawing. After the Mongols withdrew from Hungary back to Russia, Frederick turned his attention back towards Italian matters. The danger represented by the presence of the Mongols in Europe was debated again at the First Council of Lyon in 1245, but Frederick II was excommunicated by that very diet in the context of his struggle with the Papacy and ultimately abandoned the possibility of a crusade against the Mongol Empire.

Innocent IV

A new pope, Innocent IV, was elected on 25 June 1243. He was a member of a noble Imperial family and had some relatives in Frederick's camp, so the Emperor was initially happy with his election. Innocent, however, was to become his fiercest enemy. Negotiations began in the summer of 1243, but the situation changed as Viterbo rebelled, instigated by the intriguing local cardinal Ranieri Capocci. Frederick could not afford to lose his main stronghold near Rome, so he besieged Viterbo.

Innocent convinced the rebels to sign a peace but, after Frederick withdrew his garrison, Ranieri had them slaughtered on 13 November. Frederick was enraged. The new Pope was a master diplomat, and Frederick signed a peace treaty, which was soon broken. Innocent, together with most of the Cardinals, fled via Genoese galleys to Liguria, arriving on 7 July. His aim was to reach Lyon, where a new council was being held since 24 June 1245.

Despite initially appearing that the council could end with a compromise, the intervention of Ranieri, who had a series of insulting pamphlets published against Frederick (in which, among other things, he defined the emperor as a heretic and an Antichrist), led the prelates towards a less accommodating solution. One month later, Innocent IV declared Frederick to be deposed as emperor, characterising him as a "friend of Babylon's sultan", "of Saracen customs", "provided with a harem guarded by eunuchs", like the schismatic emperor of Byzantium, and in sum a "heretic".

The Pope backed Heinrich Raspe, landgrave of Thuringia, as rival for the imperial crown and set in motion a plot to kill Frederick and Enzo, with the support of the pope's brother-in-law Orlando de Rossi, another friend of Frederick. The plotters were unmasked by the count of Caserta, however, and the city of Altavilla, where they had found shelter, was razed. The guilty were blinded, mutilated, and burnt alive or hanged. An attempt to invade the Kingdom of Sicily, under the command of Ranieri, was halted at Spello by Marino of Eboli, Imperial vicar of Spoleto.

Innocent also sent a flow of money to Germany to cut off Frederick's power at its source. The archbishops of Cologne and Mainz also declared Frederick deposed, and in May 1246 Heinrich Raspe was chosen as the new king. On 5 August 1246 Heinrich, thanks to the Pope's money, managed to defeat an army of Conrad, son of Frederick, near Frankfurt. Frederick strengthened his position in Southern Germany, however, acquiring the Duchy of Austria, whose duke had died without heirs. A year later Heinrich died, and the new anti-king was William II of Holland.

Between February and March 1247 Frederick settled the situation in Italy by means of the diet of Terni, naming his relatives or friends as vicars of the various lands. He married his son Manfred to the daughter of Amedeo di Savoia and secured the submission of the marquis of Monferrato. On his part, Innocent asked protection from the King of France, Louis IX, but the king was a friend of the Emperor and believed in his desire for peace. A papal army under the command of Ottaviano degli Ubaldini never reached Lombardy, and the Emperor, accompanied by a massive army, held the next diet in Turin.

Setbacks and death

An unexpected event was to change the situation dramatically. In June 1247 the important Lombard city of Parma expelled the Imperial functionaries and sided with the Guelphs. Enzo was not in the city and could do nothing more than ask for help from his father, who came back to lay siege to the rebels, together with his friend Ezzelino III da Romano, tyrant of Verona. The besieged languished as the Emperor waited for them to surrender from starvation. He had a wooden city, which he called "Vittoria", built around the walls.

On 18 February 1248, during one of these absences, the camp was suddenly assaulted and taken, and in the ensuing Battle of Parma the Imperial side was routed. Frederick lost the Imperial treasure and with it any hope of maintaining the impetus of his struggle against the rebellious communes and against the pope, who began plans for a crusade against Sicily. Frederick soon recovered and rebuilt an army, but this defeat encouraged resistance in many cities that could no longer bear the fiscal burden of his regime: Romagna, Marche and Spoleto were lost.

In February 1249 Frederick fired his advisor and prime minister, the famous jurist and poet Pier delle Vigne, on charges of peculation and embezzlement. Some historians suggest that Pier was planning to betray the Emperor, who, according to Matthew of Paris, cried when he discovered the plot. Pier, blinded and in chains, died in Pisa, possibly by his own hand. Even more shocking for Frederick was the capture of his natural son Enzo of Sardinia by the Bolognese at the Battle of Fossalta, in May 1249. Enzo was held in a palace in Bologna, where he remained captive until his death in 1272.

Frederick lost another son, Richard of Chieti. The struggle continued: the Empire lost Como and Modena, but regained Ravenna. An army sent to invade the Kingdom of Sicily under the command of Cardinal Pietro Capocci was crushed in the Marche at the Battle of Cingoli in 1250. In the first month of that year the indomitable Ranieri of Viterbo died and the Imperial condottieri again reconquered Romagna, the Marche and Spoleto; and Conrad, King of the Romans, scored several victories in Germany against William of Holland.

Frederick did not take part in of any of these campaigns. He had been ill and likely felt tired. Despite the betrayals and the setbacks he had faced in his last years, Frederick died peacefully, wearing the habit of a Cistercian monk, on 13 December 1250 in Castel Fiorentino (territory of Torremaggiore), in Apulia, after an attack of dysentery.

At the time of his death, his preeminent position in Europe was challenged but not lost: his testament left his legitimate son Conrad the Imperial and Sicilian crowns. Manfred received the principality of Taranto and the government of the Kingdom, Henry the Kingdom of Arles or that of Jerusalem, while the son of Henry VII was entrusted with the Duchy of Austria and the March of Styria. Frederick's will stipulated that all the lands he had taken from the Church were to be returned to it, all the prisoners freed, and the taxes reduced, provided this did not damage the Empire's prestige.

However, upon Conrad's death a mere four years later, the Hohenstaufen dynasty fell from power and the Great Interregnum began, lasting until 1273, one year after the last Hohenstaufen, Enzo, had died in his prison. During this time, a legend developed that Frederick was not truly dead but merely sleeping in the Kyffhäuser Mountains and would one day awaken to reestablish his empire. Over time, this legend largely transferred itself to his grandfather, Frederick I, also known as Barbarossa ("Redbeard").

His sarcophagus (made of red porphyry) lies in the cathedral of Palermo beside those of his parents (Henry VI and Constance) as well as his grandfather, the Norman king Roger II of Sicily. He is wearing a funerary alb with a Thuluth-style inscribed cuff. A bust of Frederick sits in the Walhalla temple built by Ludwig I of Bavaria. His sarcophagus was opened in the nineteenth century and various items can be found in the British Museum's collection, including a small piece of funerary crown.

Personality and religion

Frederick's contemporaries called him stupor mundi, the "astonishment of the world"; the majority of his contemporaries were indeed astonishedand sometimes repelledby the pronounced unorthodoxy of the Hohenstaufen emperor and his temperamental stubbornness.

Frederick inherited German, Norman, and Sicilian blood, but by training, lifestyle, and temperament he was "most of all Sicilian." Maehl concludes that "To the end of his life he remained above all a Sicilian grand signore, and his whole imperial policy aimed at expanding the Sicilian kingdom into Italy rather than the German kingdom southward." Cantor concludes that "Frederick had no intention of giving up Naples and Sicily, which were the real strongholds of its power. He was, in fact, uninterested in Germany."

Frederick was a religious sceptic to an extent unusual for his era. His papal enemies used it against him at every turn. Pope Innocent IV declared him preambulus Antichristi (predecessor of the Antichrist) on July 17, 1245. As Frederick allegedly did not respect the privilegium potestatis of the Church, he was excommunicated. Frederick's religious unorthodoxy led to speculation that he was an atheist, though this is unlikely. His rationalistic mind took pleasure in the strictly logical character of Christian dogma. He was not, however, a champion of rationalism, nor had he any sympathy with the mystico-heretical movements of the time; in fact he joined in suppressing them. It was not the Church of the Middle Ages that he antagonized, but its representatives.

For his supposed "Epicureanism" (paganism), Frederick II is listed as a representative member of the sixth region of Dante's Inferno, that of the heretics, who are burned in tombs.

Worried by the independent rule the Muslim population developed since his departure in 1212, he deported the Muslim population of Sicily to Lucera on mainland Italy in 1220. In Lucera he assumed, surveillance was better in order to control them and the Muslims acknowledged that they were left with their religious freedom.  He also enlisted some in the army and six hundred as his personal bodyguards because, as Muslim soldiers, they had the advantage of immunity from papal excommunication.

Literature and science

Frederick had a great thirst for knowledge and learning. Frederick employed Jews from Sicily, who had migrated there from the holy land, at his court to translate Greek and Arabic works.

He played a major role in promoting literature through the Sicilian School of poetry. His Sicilian royal court in Palermo, saw the first use of a literary form of an Italo-Romance language, Sicilian. Through the mix of Arabic, Hebrew, Latin, Greek, and Sicilian language poems and art at the court, Arabic "muwashshahat" or "girdle poems" influenced the birth of the sonnet. The language developed by Giacomo da Lentini and Pier delle Vigne in the Sicilian School of Poetry gathering around Frederick II of Swabia in the first half of the thirteenth century had a decisive influence on Dante Alighieri and then on the development of Italian language itself. The school and its poetry were saluted by Dante and his peers and predate by at least a century the use of the Tuscan idiom as the elite literary language of Italy.

Frederick II is the author of the first treatise on the subject of falconry, De Arte Venandi cum Avibus ("The Art of Hunting with Birds"). In the words of the historian Charles Homer Haskins:

For this book he drew from sources in the Arabic language. Frederick's pride in his mastery of the art is illustrated by the story that, when he was ordered to become a subject of the Great Khan (Batu) and receive an office at the Khan's court, he remarked that he would make a good falconer, for he understood birds very well. He maintained up to fifty falconers at a time in his court, and in his letters he requested Arctic gyrfalcons from Lübeck and even from Greenland. One of the two existing versions was modified by his son Manfred, also a keen falconer.

David Attenborough in "Natural Curiosities" notes that Frederick fully understood the migration of some birds at a time when all sorts of now improbable theories were common.

Frederick loved exotic animals in general: his menagerie, with which he impressed the cold cities of Northern Italy and Europe, included hounds, giraffes, cheetahs, lynxes, leopards, exotic birds and an elephant.

He was also alleged to have carried out a number of experiments on people. These experiments were recorded by the monk Salimbene di Adam in his Chronicles. Among the experiments were shutting a prisoner up in a cask to see if the soul could be observed escaping through a hole in the cask when the prisoner died; feeding two prisoners, having sent one out to hunt and the other to bed and then having them disemboweled to see which had digested his meal better; imprisoning children and then denying them any human contact to see if they would develop a natural language.

In the language deprivation experiment young infants were raised without human interaction in an attempt to determine if there was a natural language that they might demonstrate once their voices matured. It is claimed he was seeking to discover what language would have been imparted unto Adam and Eve by God. In his Chronicles Salimbene wrote that Frederick bade "foster-mothers and nurses to suckle and bathe and wash the children, but in no ways to prattle or speak with them; for he would have learnt whether they would speak the Hebrew language (which had been the first), or Greek, or Latin, or Arabic, or perchance the tongue of their parents of whom they had been born. But he laboured in vain, for the children could not live without clappings of the hands, and gestures, and gladness of countenance, and blandishments".

Frederick was also interested in the stars, and his court was host to many astrologers and astronomers, including Michael Scot and Guido Bonatti. He often sent letters to the leading scholars of the time (not only in Europe) asking for solutions to questions of science, mathematics and physics.

In 1224 he founded the University of Naples, the world's oldest state university: now called Università Federico II.

Appearance

A Damascene chronicler, Sibt ibn al-Jawzi, left a physical description of Frederick based on the testimony of those who had seen the emperor in person in Jerusalem: "The Emperor was covered with red hair, was bald and myopic. Had he been a slave, he would not have fetched 200 dirhams at market." Frederick's eyes were described variously as blue, or "green like those of a serpent".

Law reforms
His 1241 Edict of Salerno (sometimes called "Constitution of Salerno") made the first legally fixed separation of the occupations of physician and apothecary. Physicians were forbidden to double as pharmacists and the prices of various medicinal remedies were fixed. This became a model for regulation of the practice of pharmacy throughout Europe.

He was not able to extend his legal reforms beyond Sicily to the Empire. In 1232, he was forced by the German princes to promulgate the Statutum in favorem principum ("statute in favor of princes"). It was a charter of liberties for the leading German princes at the expense of the lesser nobility and the entirety of the commoners. The princes gained whole power of jurisdiction, and the power to strike their own coins. The emperor lost his right to establish new cities, castles and mints over their territories. The Statutum severely weakened central authority in Germany. From 1232 the vassals of the emperor had a veto over imperial legislative decisions. Every new law established by the emperor had to be approved by the princes.

Significance and legacy

Historians rate Frederick II as a highly significant European monarch of the Middle Ages. This reputation was present even in Frederick's era. Lansing and English, two British historians, argue that medieval Palermo has been overlooked in favor of Paris and London:

Modern medievalists no longer accept the notion, sponsored by the popes, of Frederick as an anti-Christian. They argue that Frederick understood himself as a Christian monarch in the sense of a Byzantine emperor, thus as God's "viceroy" on earth. Whatever his personal feelings toward religion, certainly submission to the pope did not enter into the matter in the slightest. This was in line with the Hohenstaufen Kaiser-Idee, the ideology claiming the Holy Roman Emperor to be the legitimate successor to the Roman Emperors.

As his father Henry VI, Frederick established a cosmopolitan court, such as with the black treasury custodian Johannes Morus, and depiction of the different peoples under their rule, which persisted throughout the starting Late Middle Ages.

Twentieth-century treatments of Frederick vary from the sober (Wolfgang Stürner) to the dramatic (Ernst Kantorowicz). However, all agree on Frederick II's significance as Holy Roman Emperor. In the judgment of British historian Geoffrey Barraclough, Frederick's extensive concessions to German princeswhich he made in the hopes of securing his base for his Italian projectsundid the political power of his predecessors and postponed German unity for centuries.

However, the modern approach to Frederick II tends to be focused on the continuity between Frederick and his predecessors as Kings of Sicily and Holy Roman Emperors, and the similarities between him and other thirteenth-century monarchs. David Abulafia, in a biography subtitled "A Medieval Emperor," argues that Frederick's reputation as an enlightened figure ahead of his time is undeserved, and that Frederick was mostly a conventionally Christian monarch who sought to rule in a conventional medieval manner.

Family
Frederick left numerous children, legitimate and illegitimate:

Legitimate issue

First wife: Constance of Aragon (1179 – 23 June 1222). Marriage: 15 August 1209, at Messina, Sicily.
 Henry (VII) (1211 – 12 February 1242).
Second wife: Yolande of Jerusalem (1212 – 25 April 1228). Marriage: 9 November 1225, at Brindisi, Apulia.
 Margareta (November 1226 – August 1227).
 Conrad IV (25 April 1228 – 21 May 1254).
Third wife: Isabella of England (1214 – 1 December 1241). Marriage: 15 July 1235, at Worms, Germany.
 Jordan (born during the Spring of 1236, failed to survive the year); this child was given the baptismal name Jordanus as he was baptized with water brought for that purpose from the Jordan river.
 Agnes (b and d. 1237).
 Henry (18 February 1238 – May 1253), named after Henry III of England, his uncle; appointed Governor of Sicily and promised to become King of Jerusalem after his father died, but he, too, died within three years and was never crowned. Betrothed to many of Pope Innocent IV's nieces, but never married to any.
 Margaret (1 December 1241 – 8 August 1270), married Albert, Landgrave of Thuringia, later Margrave of Meissen.

Mistresses and illegitimate issue

 Unknown name, Sicilian countess. Her exact parentage is unknown, but Thomas Tuscus's Gesta Imperatorum et Pontificum (c. 1280) stated she was a nobili comitissa quo in regno Sicilie erat heres.
 Frederick of Pettorano (1212/13 – aft. 1240), who fled to Spain with his wife and children in 1240.
 Adelheid (Adelaide) of Urslingen (c. 1184 – c. 1222). Her relationship with Frederick II took place during the time he stayed in Germany between 1215 and 1220. According to some sources, she was related to the Hohenburg family under the name Alayta of Vohburg (it: Alayta di Marano); but the most accepted theory stated she was the daughter of Conrad of Urslingen, Count of Assisi and Duke of Spoleto.
 Enzo of Sardinia (1215–1272). The powerful Bentivoglio family of Bologna and Ferrara claimed descent from him.
 Caterina da Marano (1216/18 – aft. 1272), who married firstly with NN and secondly with Giacomo del Carretto, marquis of Noli and Finale.
 Matilda or Maria, from Antioch.
 Frederick of Antioch (1221–1256). Although Frederick has been ascribed up to eight children, only two, perhaps three, can be identified from primary documents. His son, Conrad, was alive as late as 1301. His daughter Philippa, born around 1242, married Manfredi Maletta, the grand chamberlain of Manfredi Lancia, in 1258. She was imprisoned by Charles of Anjou and died in prison in 1273. Maria, wife of Barnabò Malaspina, may also have been his daughter.
 An unknown member of the Lancia family:
 Selvaggia (1221/23 – 1244), married Ezzelino III da Romano.
 Manna, niece of Berardo di Castagna, Archbishop of Palermo:
 Richard of Chieti (1224/25 – 26 May 1249).
 Anais of Brienne (c. 1205–1236), cousin of Isabella II of Jerusalem:
 Blanchefleur (1226 – 20 June 1279), Dominican nun in Montargis, France.
 Richina of Wolfsöden (c. 1205 – 1236):
 Margaret of Swabia (1230–1298), married Thomas of Aquino, count of Acerra.
 Unknown mistress:
 Gerhard of Koskele (died after 1255), married Magdalena, daughter of Caupo of Turaida.

Frederick had a relationship with Bianca Lancia (c. 1200/10 – 1230/46), possibly starting around 1225. One source states that it lasted 20 years. She bore him three children:
 Constance (Anna) (1230 – April 1307), married John III Ducas Vatatzes.
 Manfred (1232 – killed in battle, Benevento, 26 February 1266), first Regent, later King of Sicily.
 Violante (1233–1264), married Riccardo Sanseverino, count of Caserta.

Matthew of Paris relates the story of a marriage confirmatio matrimonii in articulo mortis (on her deathbed) between them when Bianca was dying, but this marriage was never recognized by the Church. Nevertheless, Bianca's children were apparently regarded by Frederick as legitimate, legitimatio per matrimonium subsequens, evidenced by his daughter Constance's marriage to the Nicaean Emperor, and his own will, in which he appointed Manfred as Prince of Taranto and Regent of Sicily.

Gallery

Ancestry

See also
Dukes of Swabia family tree
Family tree of the German monarchs
Frederick the Second, Kantorowicz's biography of Frederick

Notes

References

Bibliography

 Smith, Thomas W. "Between two kings: Pope Honorius III and the seizure of the Kingdom of Jerusalem by Frederick II in 1225." Journal of Medieval History 41, 1 (2015): 41–59.

External links

 

 Frederick II – Encyclopædia Britannica
 Psalter of Frederick II from around 1235–1237
 
 
 
 Stupor mundi Italian website
 Deed by Frederick II for the branch of the Teutonic Order in Nuremberg, 30 January 1215, .

 
1194 births
1250 deaths
13th-century Holy Roman Emperors
13th-century kings of Jerusalem
Hohenstaufen
Anti-kings
Jure uxoris kings
Titular Kings of Thessalonica
Dukes of Swabia
Burials at Palermo Cathedral
Characters in the Divine Comedy
Christians of the Livonian Crusade
Christians of the Fifth Crusade
Christians of the Sixth Crusade
Christians of the Prussian Crusade
Deaths from dysentery
Founders of universities
German hunters
Italian patrons of the arts
Italian literature patrons
Medieval child monarchs
People excommunicated by the Catholic Church
Patrons of literature
People from Iesi
Sicilian School
Sonneteers